Tilo, TiLo, or TILO, may refer to:

 a local name for the herb Justicia pectoralis
 a local name for the tree Ocotea foetens
 a German male name
 since 1969
 TiLo (rapper), a former member of Methods of Mayhem 
 the Technology for Improved Learning Outcomes (TILO) educational program in Egypt
 the Treni Regionali Ticino Lombardia (TiLo) regional railway operator in southern Switzerland and northern Italy

See also
 Til (disambiguation)
 Tilia